The Haemoproteidae are a family of parasitic alveolates in the phylum Apicomplexa.

The species in this family produce pigment and do not have an asexual cycle in the blood.

Taxonomy

The genera in this family are:

 Genus Johnsprentia Landau, Chavatte & Beveridge, 2012 
 Genus Haemocystidium Castellani and Willey, 1904, emend. Telford, 1996
 Genus Haemoproteus Kruse, 1890 
 Subgenus Parahaemoproteus Bennett et al., 1965
 Subgenus Haemoproteus
 Genus Paleohaemoproteus Poinar and Telford, 2005
 Genus Sprattiella Landau et al., 2012

References

Haemosporida
Apicomplexa families